We Are Here is the fifth and final album by Japanese rock band Flower Travellin' Band, released in September 2008 by Pony Canyon Records. It is their only album after reuniting in November 2007 and the only one to feature keyboardist Nobuhiko Shinohara as a full member. We Are Here peaked at number 299 on the Oricon chart.

Production
Writing new material was one of the catalysts that brought about the group's reunion after 35 years, especially for Hideki Ishima. Ishima also remarked that even though Jun Kobayashi and George Wada had not played in years, they were eager and pushed him into doing it.

The album was recorded in Toronto, Ontario, Canada and produced by Jun's son Ben, with both Ishima and Joe Yamanaka stating that it was immediately as if they had never stopped playing together. When an interviewer suggested that their newer material was more positive than their darker, older music, Yamanaka said that although We Are Here still has the Oriental musical element of their 1970s work, it is in a more pop context.

Track listing

Personnel

The band
 Joe Yamanaka – vocals
 Hideki Ishima – sitarla
 Jun Kobayashi – bass
 George Wada – drums
 Nobuhiko Shinohara – keyboards

Technical staff
 Ben Kobayashi – producer
 Flower Travellin' Band - arranger

References

2008 albums
Flower Travellin' Band albums
Pony Canyon albums